Nadana is a village near Taraori in Haryana, India. It is famous for its basmati rice. It once became famous for self-powered tube wells, i.e. water started flowing from tube wells without power. Local people perceived it as a sign of some supernatural power. People came from far and near to bathe in the tube well water as a cure for ailments. A temple was soon constructed at that place. Sonu narwal is a current  sarpanch of this village. The village is situated near Bhakhra river.its a very beautiful place near by city taraori.

References 

Villages in Karnal district
Karnal